Glen Goei (born 22 December 1962) is one of Singapore's leading film and theatre directors. His broad ranging body of work embraces the full gamut of the performing and visual arts and includes film, theatre, musicals, large scale shows, World Expos, dance, music, and architectural design.

Glen Goei was the artistic director of Mu-Lan Arts in London from 1990 to 1998. It was the first Asian theatre company to be established in the United Kingdom. He is currently the Associate Artistic Director of the Singaporean theatre company, W!LD RICE.

Goei's film Forever Fever was the first Singapore film to achieve a worldwide commercial release. The film was distributed in America and the UK by Miramax, which then signed him on an exclusive three-picture deal.

In 1994, he received the National Youth Award for his contribution to the arts from Prime Minister Goh Chok Tong.

Early life
Born on 22 December 1962 and the youngest of seven children, Goei attended the Anglo Chinese School in Singapore from 1969 to 1980, then Jesus College, Cambridge University, in the UK from 1983 to 1986, where he earned his B.A. Honors, M.A. in history. He spent the next two years at Mountview Academy of Theatre Arts, receiving a Postgraduate Diploma in Drama, and later studied filmmaking at New York University (1994-1995).

Career
Goei's professional career started with his Olivier Award-nominated performance in the title role of M. Butterfly opposite Anthony Hopkins in London's West End.  It grew through his multi-award-winning tenure as Producer and artistic director of Mu-Lan Arts in London - the first Asian theatre company to be established in the United Kingdom. Mu-Lan's productions, like The Magic Fundoshi, garnered acclaim in London, Singapore and worldwide - including awards for Best Original Play, Best Production and Best Comedy at the Sunday Times Fringe Awards.

In 1998, Goei's film career began with his first feature Forever Fever (a.k.a. That's The Way I Like It), which he wrote, produced and directed. The film was produced under his production company, TigerTiger Productions. It was the first Singapore film to achieve a worldwide commercial release after being picked up by Miramax for distribution in America and the UK. Following its success, Miramax signed him on an exclusive three-picture deal.

His second film The Blue Mansion had its commercial release in October 2009. It was shown at the Pusan and the Tokyo International Film Festivals. Filmed at the historic Cheong Fatt Tze Mansion in Penang, the murder-mystery revolves around a wealthy man who dies suddenly and returns as a ghost to uncover the circumstances surrounding his death.

In 2013, Goei announced that acclaimed cinematographer Christopher Doyle will be shooting his third film, Yellow Flowers, a.k.a. The Hangman’s Breakfast. Written by playwright Haresh Sharma, the film touches upon Singapore's death penalty, telling the story of a single mother Eleanor on death row for unknowingly smuggling drugs, her rebellious only child who refuses to visit her, Eleanor's young lawyer Nadya who also has issues with her own mother, and the prison's reluctant executioner Gopal, who develops a friendship with Eleanor.

In 2014, Goei wrote his first book for children, Little Red in the Hood, which transplanted the traditional fairy tale to a Singapore setting. Published by Epigram Books, the children's picture book was illustrated by Drewscape, and a part of its proceeds went to charity.

In 2015, Goei's film project, Revenge of the Pontianak, was selected to be one of the 10 films to be part of the Berlinale Talent Project Market at the Berlin International Film Festival. Revenge of the Pontianak pays homage to the popular Malay horror films produced by the Shaw and Cathay studios in Singapore back in the 1950s and is produced by Tan Bee Thiam. Filming began in Malaysia in 2018, with Gavin Yap joining the production as co-director. Revenge of the Pontianak is set to have its theatrical release in August 2019.

Underpinning Goei's work in film has been his constant and substantial contribution to Singapore theatre, principally as Associate Artistic Director of the acclaimed Singapore company, W!LD RICE and frequent director for the most commercially successful company, Dream Academy.  His productions for W!LD RICE have included hits such as Boeing Boeing, The Magic Fundoshi, Blithe Spirit, Emily of Emerald Hill, La Cage aux Folles and his internationally lauded interpretation of The Importance of Being Earnest. Goei's work with Dream Academy includes the hugely popular The Revenge of The Dim Sum Dollies, Dim Sum Dollies - The History of Singapore Part 1 and 2, The Little Shop of Horrors and Into The Woods.

Personal life 
Goei is openly gay. He lives in Singapore with his partner and is an advocate for LGBT+ rights. He is a key figure behind the Ready4Repeal campaign, a petition urging the Government of Singapore to repeal Section 377A of the Penal Code, which criminalises sex between mutually consenting adult men.

Works

Theatre
 M. Butterfly, West End, London, 1989 - Actor
 Madame Mao's Memories, London 1991 and tour 1993 - Producer and Director
 Porcelain, Royal Court Theatre, London 1992 - Producer and Director
 The Magic Fundoshi, Hammersmith Theatre, London 1993 and tour 1994, 1996 - Producer and Director,
 Three Japanese Women, Soho Theatre, London, 1993 - Producer and Director
 Into The Woods, Singapore, 1994 - Director
 Kampong Amber, Singapore, 1994 - Actor & Director
 Land of a Thousand Dreams, Singapore, 1995 - Director
 Boeing Boeing, Singapore, 1995 - Director
 Godspell, Anglo-Chinese School, Singapore, 2001 - Director
 Blithe Spirit, Singapore, 2001 - Director
 Boeing Boeing (New Production) Singapore, 2002, 2005 - Director
 Revenge of the Dim Sum Dollies, Singapore, 2004 - Director
 Aladdin, Singapore, 2004 - Director
 The Magic Fundoshi (New Production), Singapore, 2006 - Director
 Little Shop of Horrors, Singapore, 2006 - Director
 Blithe Spirit, Singapore, 2007 - Director
 The Dim Sum Dollies - The History of Singapore, Singapore, 2007/08 - Director
 The Importance of Being Earnest, Singapore, 2009 - Director
 Boeing Boeing, Singapore, 2010 - Director
 Emily of Emerald Hill, Singapore, 2011 - Director
 Into The Woods (New Production), Singapore, 2011 - Director
 Family Outing, Singapore, 2011 - Director
 Aladdin(New Production), Singapore, 2011 - Director
 La Cage aux Folles, Singapore, 2012 - Director
 The Importance of Being Earnest, Singapore, 2013 - Director
 Cook a Pot of Curry, Singapore, 2013 - Director
 The House of Bernarda Alba, Singapore, 2014 - Director
 The Importance of Being Earnest, Macao Arts Festival, 2014 - Director
 The Dim Sum Dollies - The History of Singapore Part 2, Singapore, 2014 - Director
 Public Enemy, Singapore, 2015 - Director
 The Dim Sum Dollies - The History of Singapore Part 1, Singapore, 2015 - Director
 Hotel, Singapore, 2015/16 - Director
 The Importance of Being Earnest, Brisbane Festival, 2015 - Director
 La Cage aux Folles(New Production), Singapore, 2017 - Director
 Hotel, OzAsia Festival, Adelaide, 2017 - Director
 Mama White Snake, Singapore, 2017 - Actor
 Supervision, Singapore, 2018 and 2019 - Director
 Emily of Emerald Hill, Singapore, 2019 - Director
 Merdeka, Singapore, 2019 - Director
 ’’The Importance of Being Earnest,2020 - Director
 ’’The Amazing Celestial Race, 2021 and 2022 - Director
 ’’Momotaro and the Magnificent Peach, 2021 - Director
 ‘’Tartuffe’’, 2022 - Director

Film
 Forever Fever (a.k.a. That's The Way I Like It), 1998 - Writer, Executive Producer, Director
 Peggy Su!, 1997 - Actor
 The Blue Mansion, 2009 - Executive Producer & Director
 I Have Loved, 2011 - Actor
Demons, 2019 - Actor, Producer
Revenge of the Pontianak, 2019 - Writer, Executive Producer, Director
Tiong Bahru Social Club, 2019 - Executive Producer
Some Women, 2020  - Executive Producer

Television
Lovejoy, Episode "Flat Fee", TV Series, 1992 - Translator
Really Something, Singapore, 2001 - Director

Literature
 Little Red in the Hood (2014, Epigram Books) - Author

Large Scale Performance
 National Day Parade, Singapore 2003–2006 – Creative Director
 The Arts House, Opening Ceremony, Singapore, 2004 – Director
 IOC Conference, Opening Ceremony, Singapore, 2006 – Creative Director

Project Design
 Singapore Pavilion, World Expo, Nagoya, Japan, 2004–2005 – Creative Director
 New Majestic Hotel, Singapore 2006 – Guest Designer
 One North Bridge Condominium and Offices, 2006 – Creative Designer
 Bintang Goldhill Condominium, Kuala Lumpur 2008 – Creative Designer

Awards and nominations
 Life! Theatre Award for Best Production and Best Director, Hotel, 2016
Life! Theatre Award for Best Production, The Importance of Being Earnest, 2010
Singapore Press Holdings Entertainment Awards, Best Film and Best Director, The Blue Mansion, 2010
National Youth Award (Excellence) for Contribution to the Arts, Singapore, 1994
The Sunday Times Theatre Award for Best Production and Best Play, Porcelain, 1993
The Sunday Times Theatre Award for Best Comedy, The Magic Fundoshi, 1993
Laurence Olivier Award for Best Newcomer in a Play (Nomination), 1989/1990

References

External links
 
 W!ld Rice
 New York Times article on The Importance of Being Earnest
 The Guardian review of The Importance of Being Earnest
 Interview with Channel News Asia
 Interview with POSKOD.SG

Theatre in Singapore
1962 births
Anglo-Chinese School alumni
Alumni of the University of Cambridge
Alumni of the Mountview Academy of Theatre Arts
LGBT theatre directors
Singaporean LGBT people
Living people
Singaporean film directors
Singaporean theatre directors
Singaporean people of Chinese descent
Tisch School of the Arts alumni